The Rely X5 is a compact SUV revealed and released in 2010, produced by Chery under the Rely brand.

Overview

Prices of the Rely X5 at launch was 159,800 yuan with the price adjusted later to range from 109,800 yuan to 141,800 yuan. The original Rely X5 was revealed with only a 2.0-litre engine mated to a manual transmission available. However, a 2.0-litre turbo engine with a 4-speed automatic gearbox was added later in 2011. A facelift was also planned and details were released in 2011 but the facelift never happened, and the car was soon discontinued.

References

External links

Compact sport utility vehicles
2010s cars
Cars introduced in 2010
Cars of China
Crossover sport utility vehicles